Justicia nodicaulis is a plant native to the Cerrado vegetation of Brazil.

References

nodicaulis
Flora of Brazil